Robson Rotation is a method of arranging the names of candidates on ballot papers in single transferable vote elections so as to eliminate any influence of the so-called "donkey vote".

Traditionally, every ballot paper in an election is identical, with the candidates' names and their party groups (if any) in the same order. Within the party or group ticket, the order of their candidates' names is decided by the group. The order of the candidates or groups on the ballot is now usually determined by lot, by the authority running the election, although alphabetical order by surname was formerly used for elections contested by individual candidates.

Having all ballot papers the same can give a slight advantage to the candidate or group listed at the top, or top left, of the ballot paper (depending on the format of the paper), because they will attract a donkey vote. Donkey voters number the preferences on their ballots from left to right and/or top to bottom, purely in the order of the candidates' names and groups on the ballot.

Such voters are a feature of voting systems which require people to express their degree of preference for every candidate or group, by numbering them in preferential order, or have their vote declared invalid. While donkey votes may only form a small percentage of votes cast, they could affect the result in a close contest. The more candidates there are on the ballot paper, the greater the donkey vote is likely to be.

To eliminate any donkey vote advantage, the Robson Rotation system requires ballot papers to be printed in equal-sized batches, with each batch having a different candidate's name appearing at prescribed positions in the party columns on those ballots. As a consequence, there are a number of possible permutations of where candidates' names appear on the various version of the ballot paper. Although that doesn't eliminate donkey voting, it spreads its effect more-or-less equally among all the candidates standing for election.

The method, first used in the Australian state of Tasmania in the 1980 Denison state by-election, is named after Neil Robson, a former Liberal MHA for Bass. It was adopted in Australian Capital Territory elections in 1995.

Kromkowski rotation in Indiana

A similar kind of ballot rotation was introduced in St. Joseph County, Indiana, in the 1970s. The method, used for both printed ballots and lever-operated machine voting, was developed and introduced by Aloysius J. Kromkowski, the head of the election commission, and one of the most popular elected officials (St. Joseph County Clerk until term limited and St. Joseph County Treasurer until term limited). Every precinct had alphabetically shifted ballots. For example, in precinct 1, names on the ballot would be in standard alphabetical order. In precinct 2, names on the ballot would start with the second alphabetically-ordered candidate and the first ordered would be shifted to the bottom, and so on.

It was later codified into law via Indiana Code P.L.3-1987, SEC.327.

Notes

External links 
http://www.prsa.org.au/viclc/submission/sub/node15.html
http://www.prsa.org.au/tasearob.htm

Single transferable vote
Politics of Tasmania